Mount Bailey may refer to:

 Mount Bailey (Antarctica)
 Mount Bailey (Colorado), United States
 Mount Bailey (Oregon), United States

See also
 Bailey (disambiguation)